The  is a Japanese diesel multiple unit (DMU) type formerly operated by Japanese National Railways (JNR); JR Group companies such as JR East, JR West, JR Shikoku & JR Kyushu; and later by the private railway operator Isumi Railway based in Chiba, Japan, by overseas operators such as Myanmar Railways in Myanmar, and PNR in the Philippines.

112 KiHa 52 cars were built for Japanese National Railways between 1958 and 1966. The design was based on the KiHa 20 series "general purpose" DMU type, but with two engines for use on mountainous lines.

Variants
 KiHa 52 1 – 56: Built 1958–1962
 KiHa 52 101 – 156: Built 1963–1966
 KiHa 52 651: Converted from KiHa 52 101

Livery variations

JNR-era liveries

JR-era regional liveries

Resale
Following withdrawal of the last remaining examples operated by JR-West, one car, KiHa 52 125, was resold to the private operator Isumi Railway in Chiba Prefecture in April 2011. This unit was built in 1965, and formerly operated on the Etsumi-Hoku Line and Ōito Line in the Hokuriku region until 2010.

Overseas operations

Myanmar

Seventeen former KiHa 52 Diesel Railcars were shipped to Myanmar to be operated by Myanmar Railways between 2007 and 2008.
The following cars were transferred to Myanmar as shown:

Philippines

Seven former JR East KiHa 52 cars originally based at JR East Niitsu Transportation Zone were donated in September 2011 to the Philippine National Railways (PNR), where they were used on commuter services in the Manila area. In October 2013, the trains were normally operated as two 3-car formations. The seventh car, KiHa 52 123, in Niigata livery, was taken out of service after operating for only seven months, and is stored at Tutuban Depot as a source of spare parts for the rest of the fleet.

The trainsets were retired from passenger service in 2020 and they were replaced by Indonesian-built PNR 8000 class DMUs on the PNR North Main Line. KiHa 52-122 was later refurbished as the newest member of PNR's maintenance fleet in Caloocan, named the "Rescue Train" with the orange livery. The other two units from the KiHa-O trainset are still in storage in Tutuban as of October 2021. KiHa-B trainsets on the other hand were already retired in 2016 and Bicol trainsets were replaced by KiHa 35s.

The former toilets in each car are locked out of use.

Formation
During their service as commuter trains, the two three-car sets were referred to as "KiHa-O" (for orange) and "KiHa-B" (for blue) named after the liveries they carry. They were formed as shown below.

Preserved examples

In addition to KiHa 52 125 operated on the Isumi Railway,  three Kiha 52 cars are preserved in Japan, as listed below.
 KiHa 52 115: Former Tsuyama Depot roundhouse, Tsuyama, Okayama
 KiHa 52 130: Osumi Line Memorial Park, Shibushi, Kagoshima
 KiHa 52 156: Inside Itoigawa Geostation Geopal at Itoigawa Station in Itoigawa, Niigata

References

52
Philippine National Railways
Japanese National Railways
East Japan Railway Company
Kyushu Railway Company
West Japan Railway Company
Train-related introductions in 1958
Rolling stock of the Philippines

ja:国鉄キハ20系気動車#キハ52形